A territorial pick was a type of special draft choice used in the Basketball Association of America (BAA) draft in 1949 and in the National Basketball Association (NBA) draft after the 1950 season, the year in which the BAA was renamed the NBA. In the draft, NBA teams took turns selecting amateur U.S. college basketball players. Territorial picks were eliminated when the draft system was revamped in 1966.

In the first 20 years of the BAA/NBA, the league was still trying to gain the support of fans who lived in or near the teams' home markets. To achieve this, the league introduced the territorial pick rule to help teams acquire popular players from colleges in their area who would presumably have strong local support. Before the draft, a team could forfeit its first-round draft pick and then select any player from within a  radius of its home arena. As a result of the territorial picks being selected before the draft, these picks were not factored into the overall selection count of the draft; therefore, the first non-territorial pick of the draft was considered the first overall pick.

Of the 23 territorial picks, 12 players have been inducted into the Naismith Memorial Basketball Hall of Fame. Tom Heinsohn, Wilt Chamberlain, Oscar Robertson and Jerry Lucas are the only four territorial picks who won the Rookie of the Year Award. Chamberlain also won the Most Valuable Player Award in his rookie season. He went on to win the Most Valuable Player Award three more times in his career. Oscar Robertson is the only other territorial pick who has won the Most Valuable Player Award; he won it in the 1963–64 season. The Philadelphia Warriors had the most territorial picks, having selected six who attended a total of five colleges. The University of Cincinnati had the most players taken as a territorial pick; three Cincinnati players were selected using this method by the Cincinnati Royals. The 1965 NBA draft, the last draft in which the rule remained in effect, had the most territorial picks in a single draft with three. The 1953 draft also had three territorial picks.  No territorial pick was selected in the 1954, 1957 and 1961 drafts.

Key

List of territorial picks

See also
KHL territorial pick
CFL territorial pick

Notes

  Although Wilt Chamberlain was playing at the University of Kansas, outside the territory of any NBA team, he was selected as the Philadelphia Warriors' territorial pick. The Warriors argued that because Chamberlain had grown up in Philadelphia and played high school basketball at Overbrook High School in Philadelphia, they held his territorial rights. The NBA agreed with the argument, hence making him the first and only territorial pick based solely on his pre-college roots.
  Although Oscar Robertson was drafted as a territorial pick, he was also recognized as the first pick in the first round of the draft as the Cincinnati Royals also held the first overall draft pick.
  Although Jerry Lucas was playing at Ohio State University, outside the territory of the Cincinnati Royals, the Royals were the only NBA team in Ohio, so the NBA granted them the rights to pick Lucas as their territorial pick. Lucas also qualified under the same criterion as Chamberlain, as he grew up in Middletown, Ohio and played high school basketball at Middletown High School, which was within Cincinnati's territorial radius.

References

External links
NBA.com: NBA Draft History

National Basketball Association draft
National Basketball Association lists